Sultan Azlan Shah Airport  is an airport that serves Ipoh, a city in the state of Perak, Malaysia. Sultan Azlan Shah Airport has been ranked as the seventh busiest airport in Malaysia.

History 
Originating as a small airfield for Fokker aircraft, eventually being expanded so that jet operations could be accommodated. The then new airport terminal was made ready for the visit by Queen Elizabeth II to the Royal Town of Kuala Kangsar in 1989. The airport had then been used by many passengers (somewhat due to Malaysia Airlines serving the city and still being based in Subang).

Once the North-South Expressway opened, many people opted to use other methods rather than the often more expensive air travel; as a consequence of the lack of demand, Malaysia Airlines and later AirAsia withdrew their services. Following the introduction of electric trains having a direct link to Kuala Lumpur city centre, Malaysia Airports were forced to reconsider the financial viability of the site.

In the hopes of renewing the airport for use by larger airlines, a new and 'modern' terminal building and an extended runway were constructed at a cost of RM45 million. The key features of the new terminal were a larger and more spacious departure and arrival halls, full air-conditioning in the terminal, and increased passenger capacity.

Unfortunately the new runway was left to be restricted to turboprop airliners only, due to a number of potholes. Several months later, the issue was resolved, only to then have a repeated issue. Since then, the runway has been safe and used daily.

Malindo Air started a new service to Medan in 2018.

AirAsia resumed services from Johor Bahru to Ipoh in October 2018.

In December 2018, AirAsia launched services to Singapore from Ipoh.

Future 
Upon the realisation by the Malaysian Government that the airport was unable to continue to expand (due to being surrounded by residential areas), there have been suggestions that sites further away from the city centre, in either Seri Iskandar or Batang Padang near Tapah. However, there have been no such actions in the subsequent years.

An alternative plan had been considered to utilise Ipoh as a feeder airport, as the airport was unable to compete with the larger and more established airports in Penang and Kuala Lumpur International Airport.

Several airlines have mentioned their desire to begin serving the airport, but only plans by Tigerair (now Scoot) have materialised. Other airlines based in China and Indonesia have also expressed interest.

In March 2017, the Perak state government announced that the airport's operators would be upgrading the terminal so that there would be more space for passengers.

Airlines and destinations

Passenger

Traffic and statistics

References

External links 

 
 Sultan Azlan Shah Airport, Ipoh at Malaysia Airports Holdings Berhad
 Location Map of Sultan Azlah Shah Airport
 
 
 New Ipoh Airport Strategy,NST Online,17/03/2010

Airports in Perak
Buildings and structures in Ipoh